Sampat Pal is an Indian social activist from the Bundelkhand region of Uttar Pradesh, North India. She is founder of the Gulabi Gang, an Uttar Pradesh-based social organisation, works for women welfare and empowerment. She was participant of Colors TV's reality show Bigg Boss 6.

Background 
Sampat Pal founded the Gulabi Gang to further the cause of women's rights. It developed into an organised women's movement with as many as 270,000 members spread over several districts in Uttar Pradesh. The women wear Gulabi (pink) saris and arm themselves with bamboo sticks, which they use whenever they come up against violent resistance.

Pal described her early life in an autobiography written with the collaboration of the French journalist Anne Berthod. According to a BBC report, Banda district is a “highly caste-ridden, feudalistic and male dominated society. Dowry demands and domestic and sexual violence are common. Locals say it is not surprising that a women's vigilante group has sprung up in this landscape of poverty, discrimination and chauvinism“.

On 2 March 2014, Pal was relieved of her role at the head of the Gulabi Gang amid allegations of financial impropriety and putting her personal interests ahead of those of the group.

Television

References

Further reading
 
 

Living people
Indian women activists
Social workers
Activists from Uttar Pradesh
Women from Uttar Pradesh
Indian women's rights activists
20th-century Indian women
20th-century Indian people
People from Banda district, India
21st-century Indian women
21st-century Indian people
Social workers from Uttar Pradesh
Year of birth missing (living people)
Bigg Boss (Hindi TV series) contestants